Sergio Casal and Emilio Sánchez were the defending champions, but did not participate this year.

Lan Bale and John-Laffnie de Jager won the title, defeating Jan Apell and Jonas Björkman 6–7, 6–2, 7–6 in the final.

Seeds

  Jan Apell /  Jonas Björkman (final)
  Lan Bale /  John-Laffnie de Jager (champions)
  Neil Broad /  Greg Van Emburgh (quarterfinals)
  Luis Lobo /  Javier Sánchez (semifinals)

Draw

Draw

External links
Draw

Doubles